Pilodeudorix fumata, the smoky diopetes, is a butterfly in the family Lycaenidae. It is found in Ghana, the north-eastern part of the Democratic Republic of the Congo and southern Uganda.

References

Butterflies described in 1954
Deudorigini